Deletionpedia is an online archive wiki containing articles deleted from the English Wikipedia. Its version of each article includes a header with more information about the deletion such as whether a speedy deletion occurred, where the deletion discussion about the article can be found and which editor deleted the article. The original Deletionpedia operated from February to September 2008. The site was restarted under new management in December 2013.

The site is based on MediaWiki.  The site functions as something of a "wikimorgue"; it automatically collects articles deleted from Wikipedia.

In addition to categories preserved from Wikipedia, Deletionpedia has its own categories for articles, based upon the deletion criteria. Pages are organized by the month in which they were deleted, by the number of editors that had worked on a page and by the length of time the article had existed on Wikipedia.

Deletionpedia states that it avoids hosting deleted pages that are copyright violations, pages with serious libel problems, pages whose full revision history is still available on Wikipedia's sister sites, and pages which set out to offend others.

Articles preserved by Deletionpedia were deleted from Wikipedia for a variety of reasons, from "being not notable" to "manipulation by political and business interests". The site seeks no donations; its "Donate" page formerly suggested that supporters donate to mySociety or to the Wikimedia Foundation instead.

Version 1

The original Deletionpedia collected about 63,000 articles, which were deleted from Wikipedia between February and September 2008. Nearly 2000 of the pages were more than 1000 days old before they were deleted.

Demise
The last viewable log the site made of Wikipedia was taken on 14 June 2012 of Anime Festival Wichita.

The original content is still available to view online. In 2011, Jason Scott's Archive Team saved a copy of the website with WikiTeam tools and uploaded the copy to the Internet Archive's collection.

Reception
The Wall Street Journal cited it as a response to the culture clash that exists on Wikipedia between deletionists and inclusionists. The Industry Standard calls it "a [would-be] fine research project for sociology students to study what groupthink does when applied to a community-built compendium of knowledge". Shortly thereafter, the Industry Standard again turned its attention to Deletionpedia, reporting that deletion of the article in Wikipedia about Deletionpedia was itself under discussion, suggesting that the article was not being considered for deletion based on “insignificance of the site” but rather “due to perceived criticism of Wikipedia itself”. Deletionpedia also made news at De Telegraaf, the website for the largest daily morning Dutch language newspaper, and The Inquirer, a British technology tabloid website.

The site has been more fully explored by Ars Technica
 in an article that not only describes aspects of the website but mentions the controversy over deleting the Wikipedia article on Deletionpedia.

Statistics and version 2
The website was reregistered by a new owner, Kasper Souren, and began operation anew in December 2013. As of Feb 2022, it had amassed 91,250 content pages, and 117902 pages in total, with 239,847 edits. It had also acquired 4,020 users.

Similar projects 

There are similar projects for other Wikipedia languages, for example PlusPedia in German, PrePedia in Polish, and Wikisage in Dutch.

See also

 archive.is
 Deletionism and inclusionism in Wikipedia
 Rejecta Mathematica
 Reliability of Wikipedia
 Wayback Machine
 WebCite

References

External links
 
 
 Deletionpedia dump by WikiTeam (may contain errors)

Internet properties established in 2008
Wikipedia-derived encyclopedias
MediaWiki websites
History of Wikipedia
Criticism of Wikipedia